Yarisley Silva Rodríguez (born 1 June 1987) is a Cuban pole vaulter. She won the silver medal at the 2012 Summer Olympics – the first Latin American athlete to win an Olympic medal in that event.

Silva became the first Cuban woman to reach a world class standard in the pole vault. Her personal bests of  outdoors and  indoors are the Cuban and Central American and Caribbean records for the event.

She emerged at the regional level with a silver medal at the 2006 Central American and Caribbean Games, and a bronze medal at the 2007 Pan American Games. She then won gold medals at the 2009 Central American and Caribbean Championships in Athletics and the 2011 Pan American Games.

Silva represented Cuba at the 2008 Summer Olympics and came fifth at the 2011 World Championships in Athletics.

Career

Early career
Born in Pinar del Río in Cuba, Silva began to participate in pole vault competitions from the age of twelve. Many women in her family took part in athletics and her mother was a javelin thrower. In spite of its strong traditions in track and field, pole vaulting was a discipline in which Cuba had not historically been successful. As a result, Silva quickly established herself nationally at the age of sixteen, coming second at the Cuban Athletics Championships and winning the Barrientos Memorial in 2003. In 2004, she cleared four metres for the first time, which was a Central American and Caribbean junior record. She improved this to 4.10 m at the 2005 Barrientos meet, winning the competition again.

The 2006 season saw her win her first national title and take a third Barrientos Memorial win. She competed internationally for the first time, taking silver at the Central American and Caribbean Games, but failing to clear a height at the 2006 World Junior Championships in Athletics after her poles did not arrive at the competition. Silva ended the season having improved her regional junior record to 4.20 m. In her first year of senior competition she won gold at the 2007 ALBA Games and a bronze at the 2007 Pan American Games. The latter was her country's first medal in the event at the Games and she broke the Central American and Caribbean record with her clearance of 4.30 m. She improved to 4.50 m in early 2008, but a lack of high level competitions meant she managed on 4.15 m in qualifying on her Olympic debut in Beijing.

Silva competed solely in Havana in 2009 and 2010, but still managed to equal her personal best, win the Barrientos meet, and take the gold medal at the 2009 Central American and Caribbean Championships in Athletics with a championship record of 4.40 m.

International competition and Olympic medal
The 2011 season marked the first time she gained the chance to compete on the international circuit against world class opposition. She competed extensively and had a series of top three finishes across Europe. She broke her personal best on five occasions that year, improving from 4.55 m to 4.75 m over the course of the year.

Silva, coached by Alexander Navas, and her fellow Cuban vaulter Lazaro Borges both emerged as top level athletes in the men's and women's pole vault that year. At the 2011 World Championships in Athletics she came fifth in the final with a regional record vault of 4.70 m, while Borges broke the Cuban record to take the men's silver medal. The pair took gold medals in their events at the end-of-season 2011 Pan American Games, where Silva beat world champion Fabiana Murer with a games record mark of 4.75 m.

Her first indoor meetings came at the start of 2012. In February she set Cuban indoor records of 4.60 m at the Pole Vault Stars meet, 4.71 m at the Meeting Pas de Calais, then 4.72 m at the XL Galan, finishing in the top three each time. Silva placed seventh at the 2012 IAAF World Indoor Championships. Outdoors she competed five times on the 2012 IAAF Diamond League circuit and was always in the top three, including a victory at the DN Galan. At the 2012 London Olympics she equalled her personal best of 4.75 m in the women's pole vault final to place second behind Jenn Suhr and win the silver medal – an Olympic first in the pole vault by a Latin American athlete.

Silva began 2013 with a world-leading mark of 4.76 m to win the Pole Vault Stars meeting. She added two centimetres to this mark two weeks later while winning the XL Galan. Returning to Havana for the national championships in March, she vaulted over 4.81 m to add six centimetres to her outdoor best. Taking aim at greater heights, she altered her technique, holding the pole higher and extending her run-up. Silva improved her record again at the Drake Relays on 26 April, winning with 4.85 m and beating Suhr and then cleared 4.90 in Hengelo, Netherlands.  She took the bronze medal at the World Athletics Championships in Moscow with a jump of 4.82 m, behind Yelena Isinbayeva and Jennifer Suhr.

During winter 2014, Silva became world champion at the World Indoor Championships held in Sopot. She later won the outdoor world title at the 2015 World Championships in Beijing jumping 4.90 m.

Personal bests
Outdoor pole vault: 4.91 m – Beckum, Germany 2 August 2015
Indoor pole vault:  4.82 m – Des Moines, United States 24 April 2013

Achievements

References

External links
 
 
 
 

1987 births
Living people
People from Pinar del Río
Cuban female pole vaulters
Olympic athletes of Cuba
Olympic silver medalists for Cuba
Athletes (track and field) at the 2008 Summer Olympics
Athletes (track and field) at the 2012 Summer Olympics
Athletes (track and field) at the 2016 Summer Olympics
Medalists at the 2012 Summer Olympics
World Athletics Championships athletes for Cuba
World Athletics Championships medalists
Pan American Games gold medalists for Cuba
Pan American Games bronze medalists for Cuba
Pan American Games medalists in athletics (track and field)
Athletes (track and field) at the 2007 Pan American Games
Athletes (track and field) at the 2011 Pan American Games
Athletes (track and field) at the 2015 Pan American Games
Athletes (track and field) at the 2019 Pan American Games
Olympic silver medalists in athletics (track and field)
Central American and Caribbean Games gold medalists for Cuba
Competitors at the 2006 Central American and Caribbean Games
Competitors at the 2014 Central American and Caribbean Games
Competitors at the 2018 Central American and Caribbean Games
World Athletics Indoor Championships winners
Pan American Games gold medalists in athletics (track and field)
World Athletics Championships winners
Central American and Caribbean Games medalists in athletics
Medalists at the 2011 Pan American Games
Medalists at the 2015 Pan American Games
Medalists at the 2019 Pan American Games
Athletes (track and field) at the 2020 Summer Olympics
21st-century Cuban women
Cuban people of African descent